Keelung City is represented in the Legislative Yuan since 2008 by one at-large single-member constituency (Keelung City Constituency).

Current district
 Keelung

Legislators

Election results

2020

2016

References 

2008 establishments in Taiwan
Constituencies in Taiwan
Keelung